Genesis is a 2018 Hungarian drama film directed by Árpád Bogdán. It was screened in the Panorama section at the 68th Berlin International Film Festival.

Cast
 Milán Csordás as Ricsi
 Anna Marie Cseh as Hanna
 Eniko Anna Illesi as Virág
 Lídia Danis as Mira

References

External links
 

2018 films
2018 drama films
Hungarian drama films
2010s Hungarian-language films